LIM domain kinase 1 is an enzyme that in humans is encoded by the LIMK1 gene.

Function 

There are approximately 40 known eukaryotic LIM proteins, so named for the LIM domains they contain. LIM domains are highly conserved cysteine-rich structures containing 2 zinc fingers. Although zinc fingers usually function by binding to DNA or RNA, the LIM motif probably mediates protein-protein interactions. LIM kinase-1 and LIM kinase-2 belong to a small subfamily with a unique combination of 2 N-terminal LIM motifs, a central PDZ domain, and a C-terminal protein kinase domain. LIMK1 is likely to be a component of an intracellular signaling pathway and may be involved in brain development.

Clinical significance 

LIMK1 hemizygosity is implicated in the impaired visuospatial constructive cognition of Williams syndrome.

Interactions 

LIMK1 has been shown to interact with:
 CFL1,
 CDKN1C,
 NRG1,
 PAK1,
 PAK4, and 
 YWHAZ.

References

Further reading

External links 
LIMK1 Info with links in the Cell Migration Gateway